This is a Chinese name; the family name is Wu. In the stage name, the surname is Miao.

Miao Ke-li (born 13 January 1971) is a Taiwanese actress, television host and singer.

Born in Taichung, Miao began her career as a singer in 1988 after participating in a singing competition at the age of fifteen. She turned to acting in the late nineties with small roles in television series such as Ah Bian and Ah Jane. In 2002, Miao had her breakthrough role in Taiwanese-language series Fiery Thunderbolt. From then she starred in television series such as Taiwan Tornado, Golden Ferris Wheel and Unique Flavor. In 2013 she won Best Actress at the Golden Bell Awards for her work in Flavor of Life.

Filmography

Television series

Film

Variety show

Discography

Studio albums

Singles

Published works

Awards and nominations

References

External links

 
 
 
 Miao Ke-li at Arjay International Entertainment

1971 births
Living people
Actresses from Taichung
20th-century Taiwanese actresses
21st-century Taiwanese actresses
Taiwanese film actresses
Taiwanese television actresses
20th-century Taiwanese women singers
21st-century Taiwanese women singers
Taiwanese women television presenters
Musicians from Taichung